Erasmo Mulè (born 13 June 1999) is an Italian professional footballer who plays as a defender for  club Monopoli on loan from Juventus.

Club career
He made his senior debut in the 2017–18 season with Serie D club Recanatese.

On 16 July 2018, he signed a technical training contract with Trapani. He made his Serie C debut for Trapani on 18 September 2018 in a game against Reggina, as a starter.

On 16 January 2019, he signed with Serie A club Sampdoria and was loaned back to Trapani until the end of the 2018–19 season.

On 1 August 2019, he signed with Juventus. He was assigned to their second squad. On 5 October 2020, he joined Juve Stabia on loan. On 21 August 2021, Mulè moved to Cesena on loan.

On 3 January 2023, Mulè joined Monopoli on loan.

References

External links
 

1999 births
Living people
People from Alcamo
Sportspeople from the Province of Trapani
Footballers from Sicily
Italian footballers
Association football defenders
Serie C players
Serie D players
Parma Calcio 1913 players
U.S.D. Recanatese 1923 players
Trapani Calcio players
U.C. Sampdoria players
Juventus Next Gen players
S.S. Juve Stabia players
Cesena F.C. players
U.S. Catanzaro 1929 players
S.S. Monopoli 1966 players